Hibbertia avonensis is a species of flowering plant in the family Dilleniaceae and is endemic to the south-west of Western Australia. It is a shrub with narrow oblong leaves and bright yellow flowers arranged singly in leaf axils with about ten stamens fused at their bases on one side of the two carpels.

Description
The upper surface of the leaves is covered with small tubercules, each with a hair in the centre. There are usually ten stamens, fused at the base and on one side of the two carpels that each contain two ovules. Flowering occurs from August to October.

Taxonomy
Hibbertia avonensis was first formally described in 2002 by Judith R. Wheeler in the journal Nuytsia from specimens collected by Ruurd Dirk Hoogland near Pingrup in 1971. The specific epithet (avonensis) refers to the distribution of this species that occurs almost entirely in the Avon Wheatbelt biogeographic region.

Distribution
This hibbertia grows in heath, shrubland, usually in sandy soil, mostly in the Avon Wheatbelt.

Conservation status
Goodenia avonensis is classified as "not threatened" by the Government of Western Australia Department of Parks and Wildlife.

See also
List of Hibbertia species

References

avonensis
Flora of Western Australia
Plants described in 2002